Peter Denys  (1760 – 1816) was a British drawing master, later patron of the arts and landowner.

He was the son of the language teacher Peter Denys (sometimes Denyss), who was himself the son of a Swiss emigrant.

Denys was High Sheriff of Northamptonshire in 1812.

Denys married his pupil, Lady Charlotte Fermor (1766–1835), daughter of George Fermor, 2nd Earl of Pomfret. With her income of £4,000 a year, he bought Sloane Place in London, and Fremington, Yorkshire.

Their son was the politician, Sir George Denys, 1st Baronet (1788–1857).

References

1760 births
1816 deaths
High Sheriffs of Northamptonshire
Deputy Lieutenants of Northamptonshire